Johannes Moser is a German ethnologist who is Chair for Volkskunde/European Ethnology at the Ludwig Maximilian University of Munich.

Biography
Moser received his Ph.D. in ethnology from the University of Graz 1993, and habilitated at the Goethe University Frankfurt in 2002. Moser has researched and taught at the universities of Graz, Vienna, Frankfurt, Zurich, and Basel. Since August 2006, Moser has been Chair for Volkskunde/European Ethnology at the Ludwig Maximilian University of Munich.

Selected works
 Europäisch-ethnologisches Forschen, 2013
 Wissenschaft als Leidenschaft, 2013
 Europäische Ethnologie in München, 2015
 The Vulnerable Middle Class?, 2019

References

German ethnologists
Living people
Academic staff of the Ludwig Maximilian University of Munich
University of Graz alumni
Year of birth missing (living people)